Marmaduke Wyvill (22 December 1815 in Constable Burton – 25 June 1896 in Bournemouth) was a leading English chess master and Liberal Party politician. He was among the world's strongest players in the 1840s and 1850s.

He was born the son of Marmaduke Wyvill of Constable Burton Hall (1791–1872), MP for York.

Regarded by Howard Staunton as 'one of the finest players in England', he was primarily an enthusiastic amateur of chess, yet in his sole tournament appearance at London 1851 he took second prize behind Adolf Anderssen. Finishing ahead of Staunton, Elijah Williams, Bernhard Horwitz, and Jozsef Szen, he succumbed only to Anderssen in the final, by a score of 2½-4½. Long after he had retired from competitive play, he retained a great interest in the game and was known to have contributed to the organisation and funding of the 1883 London tournament.

Through his 1845 marriage to Laura, daughter of Sir Charles Ibbetson, Bart., he came into possession of Denton Hall. In 1847 Wyvill was elected as a Member of Parliament (MP) for Richmond, North Yorkshire. He retained the seat in 1861, but lost it in 1865, regaining it for a final time in 1866.

In a chess game, the Wyvill formation refers to a pawn formation in which White has no pawn on the b file, doubled pawns at c3 and c4, and the d-pawn at d4 or d5, such as may typically arise out of variations of the Nimzo-Indian and (Winawer) French Defences. The pawn at c4 may become a weakness, since it cannot be supported by other pawns.

Notable game

His triumph in the third game of the final of the London tournament saw Wyvill winning with a fine counter-attack after defending Anderssen's attack with great expertise. As Staunton put it in a note to Black's 28th move: "... the assault is conducted with uncommon ingenuity and spirit."
 Anderssen - Wyvill, London 1851
Sicilian Defence - 1. e4 c5 2. d4 cxd4 3. Nf3 Nc6 4. Nxd4 e6 5. Be3 Nf6 6. Bd3
Be7 7. O-O O-O 8. Nd2 d5 9. Nxc6 bxc6 10. e5 Nd7 11. f4 f5
12. Rf3 c5 13. Rh3 Rf7 14. b3 g6 15. Nf3 Nb6 16. Bf2 d4
17. Bh4 Nd5 18. Qd2 a5 19. Bxe7 Rxe7 20. Ng5 Ne3 21. Qf2 Bb7
22. Bf1 Ng4 23. Qh4 Qd7 24. Rd1 Rc8 25. Be2 h5 26. Rg3 Qe8
27. Rd2 Rg7 28. c3 Ne3 29. cxd4 cxd4 30. Rxd4 Rc1+ 31. Kf2 Nd5
32. Rgd3 Qc6 33. Rd2 Qb6 34. Bc4 Rc2 35. Ke1 Rxd2 36. Rxd2
Qg1+ 37. Bf1 Rc7 38. Rd1 Rc2 39. Qg3 Ba6 40. Qf3 Bxf1 0-1

References

External links 
 
 Family tree of Marmaduke Wyvill
 31 chess games of Marmaduke Wyvill

1815 births
1896 deaths
British chess players
Liberal Party (UK) MPs for English constituencies
UK MPs 1847–1852
UK MPs 1852–1857
UK MPs 1857–1859
UK MPs 1859–1865
UK MPs 1865–1868
19th-century chess players